M.R.S. (Most Requested Show) is a variety talk show on ABS-CBN that premiered on January 31, 2005 and ended on July 15, 2005. The show premieres after Homeboy in the morning block. The show served as the reunion of former Magandang Tanghali Bayan hosts Roderick Paulate, Amy Perez and Marvin Agustin. Former Eat Bulaga! host Toni Gonzaga was also added as main host since the show's first inception, making this her first project upon transferring from GMA Network to ABS-CBN. Due to Homeboy's higher ratings, the management decided to extend the show's airtime, displacing "MRS".

Hosts

Main hosts
Roderick Paulate
Amy Perez
Marvin Agustin
Toni Gonzaga

Co-hosts
Ahron Villena
AJ Dee
JE Sison
Nikki Gil
Erich Gonzales
Pokwang
Kitkat
Sheryn Regis

See also
List of programs broadcast by ABS-CBN

References

External links
 

ABS-CBN original programming
Philippine variety television shows
2005 Philippine television series debuts
2005 Philippine television series endings
Filipino-language television shows